Antonia Margaret Ax:son Johnson (born 1943) is the fourth-generation head of the family company Axel Johnson AB, founded by her great-grandfather in 1873. In 1982 she succeeded her father as chairman of the board for Axel Johnson AB, Sweden, and Axel Johnson Inc., Stamford, U.S.

According to Forbes Johnson was the third richest Swedish billionaire in 2013. As of March 2013 Forbes reported her net worth as $9.2B.

The colon in Ax:son indicates a contraction in the Swedish style. The full name is Axelson.

Education
Antonia Ax:son Johnson attended Radcliffe College in Cambridge, Massachusetts, as an exchange student, and she holds a master's degree in psychology and economics from the Stockholm University. She has been awarded the honorary degree of doctor of civil law from Bishop's University, Quebec, Canada, as well as a doctor of humane letters from Middlebury College of Vermont. She also studied in Ibero in Mexico City.

Wealth
Antonia Ax:son Johnson has a net worth of US$6.0 billion, largely inherited and still growing. The Axel Johnson Group is said to be worth in excess of US$11 billion.

See also
Ax:son Johnson family

Notes

References

External links
Forbes.com: Forbes World's Richest People

1943 births
Living people
Female billionaires
21st-century Swedish businesswomen
21st-century Swedish businesspeople
Liberals (Sweden) politicians
Swedish billionaires
20th-century Swedish businesswomen
20th-century Swedish businesspeople